The Haldia–Raxaul Expressway is a 650 km (400 mi) planned and upcoming green field access controlled expressway in West Bengal, Jharkhand and Bihar. It will connect Raxaul with Haldia port.

Route

West Bengal
Haldia–Raxaul Expressway starts in Haldia, Purba Medinipur district, West Bengal. It crosses Medinipur and Bardhaman Division in West Bengal, and enters Jharkhand state.

Jharkhand 
This expressway passes through Deoghar and Dumka district in Jharkhand.

Bihar
This expressway passes through Banka, Jamui, Sheikhpura, Nalanda district, Patna, Saran, Muzaffarpur, East Champaran district and West Champaran district in Bihar.

Background 
Haldia port currently handles most of Nepal's trade, but there is no developed highway with Haldia port to the India–Nepal border. Haldia-Raxaul Expressway is proposed to be constructed with the aim of establishing better highway connectivity.

The 650 km long expressway will serve the primary objective of improving freight efficiency and increasing exports from neighboring regions.

History 
The National Highways Authority of India (NHAI) invited tenders in 2021 to prepare a detailed project report for an expressway connecting Raxaul in Bihar on the Indo-Nepal border with the Haldia port in West Bengal. After opening technical bids on 17 June 2021, the National Highways Authority of India announced that 13 design and engineering firms had submitted bids to prepare a detailed project report for the approximately 650 km Raxaul-Haldia Expressway.

See also
 Expressways in India

References

Expressways in West Bengal
Roads in Bihar
Proposed expressways in India
Transport in Haldia
Transport in Raxaul